"Daddy" is a nickname for:

 Evgenii Dadonov (born 1989), Russian ice hockey player in the National Hockey League
 Rowland Hill, 1st Viscount Hill (1772–1842), general and Commander-in-Chief of the British Army
 Frederick Charles Victor Laws (1887–1975), Royal Air Force group captain, aerial surveyor and the founder and most prominent pioneer of British aerial reconnaissance
 Jim Neal (1930–2011), American National Basketball Association player
 Robert Daddy Potts (1898–1981), a football player in the 1926 National Football League season
 Thomas D. Rice (1808–1860), American blackface minstrel show entertainer
 Joe Stevenson (born 1982), semi-retired mixed martial artist
 Moses Wilkinson (1746/47–?), African-American runaway slave and Methodist preacher
 Oliver "Daddy" Warbucks, a major character in the comic strip Little Orphan Annie
 Reginald "Daddy" McDonald, a fictional character in the soap opera Number 96

See also 

 
 
 Big Daddy (disambiguation)
 Dad (nickname)
 Pappy
 Pop (nickname)
 Pops (nickname)

Lists of people by nickname